Amrish Puri (22 June 1932 – 12 January 2005) was an Indian actor, who was one of the most notable and important figures in Indian cinema and Theatre. He acted in more than 450 films, established himself as one of the most popular actors in Indian Cinema. Puri is remembered for playing various roles in variety of film genres, specially iconic villainous roles in Hindi Cinema, as well as International Cinema. He reigned supreme in villainous roles in the 1980s and 1990s, his dominating screen presence and distinctive deep voice made him stand out amongst the other villains of the day. Puri was active in both, art cinema such as in some of Shyam Benegal and Govind Nihalani's films and mainly in mainstream cinema. Puri won three Filmfare Awards for Best Supporting Actor in eight nominations. He also holds most Filmfare Award for Best Villain nominations.
 
While he predominantly worked in Hindi-language films, he had also appeared in Punjabi, Telugu, Kannada, Tamil, Malayalam and Marathi language films. Puri played some of most remembered villainous roles in  Vidhaata (1982), Shakti (1982), Hero (1983), Meri Jung (1985), Nagina (1986), Mr. India (1987), Shahenshah (1988), Ram Lakhan (1989), Tridev (1990), Ghayal (1990), Saudagar (1991), Thalapathi (1991), Tahalka (1992), Damini (1993), Karan Arjun (1995), Kaalapani (1996), Jeet (1996), Koyla (1997), Baadshah (1999 film), Gadar: Ek Prem Katha (2001), and Nayak: The Real Hero (2001). Puri's performance of the main antagonist Mogambo from Shekhar Kapur's Mr. India (1987) is considered as one of greatest villains of all time in Indian Cinema. It was reported that he received a salary of ₹10 million (US$771,890.82), making him the highest-paid Indian villain actor of all time.  His comic role in Chachi 420, that he acted alongside Kamal Haasan was well received by critics.

Puri was a highly prolific actor; he also featured in positive supporting roles, of which he won 3 times Filmfare Awards for Best Supporting Actor. Some of his notable positive roles are Phool Aur Kaante (1991), Gardish (1993), Dilwale Dulhaniya Le Jayenge (1995), Ghatak (1996), Diljale (1996) Pardes (1997), Virasat (1997), China Gate (1998), Badal (2000), Mujhe Kucch Kehna Hai (2001), Mujhse Shaadi Karogi (2004) and Hulchul (2004). 

To Western audiences, he is best known as Mola Ram in Steven Spielberg's Hollywood film Indiana Jones and the Temple of Doom (1984) and as Khan in Richard Attenborough's Gandhi (1982).

His grandson, Vardhan Puri is also an actor in Indian Cinema, having written and starred in a film produced by a production house named after Puri, Amrish Puri Films.

Early life 
Amrish Lal Puri was born in  a Punjabi Hindu family in Nawanshahr, Punjab, to Lala Nihal Chand and Ved Kaur. He had four siblings, elder brothers Chaman Puri and Madan Puri (both of whom were also actors), elder sister Chandrakanta, and a younger brother, Harish Puri. He was the first cousin of the actor and singer K. L. Saigal.

Career 
Puri acted in more than 450 films between 1967 and 2005, most of which were hits, and was one of the most successful villains in Bollywood. Yet, his early years were marked by relentless struggle and he was nearly fifty years of age before he first played a leading character (as main villain) in a film.

Puri's family had some film connections. The singer and actor K. L. Saigal, one of the pioneers of Indian cinema, was Puri's first cousin. Enamoured by the fame of their cousin, Puri's older brothers, Chaman Puri and Madan Puri, had moved to Mumbai in the 1950s to try their luck in films and had found work as character actors. Puri likewise came to Mumbai in the mid-1950s to try his luck, but failed his first screen test. He however managed to land a stable job with the Employees State Insurance Corporation (ESIC), a government organization, and indulged his hobby of acting by becoming part of an amateur natak mandali or stage group. His group often performed at the Prithvi Theatre in plays written by Satyadev Dubey. He eventually became well known as a stage actor and even won the Sangeet Natak Akademi Award in 1979. This theatre recognition soon led to work in television advertisements and eventually to films at the relatively late age of 40 (forty).

This was in the early 1970s, and he hardly had a dialogue to utter in his first few films, which is remarkable, because his baritone voice was to be his source of fame in later years. These bit appearances were still counted a hobby, since he continued with his government job in order to support his family. Throughout the 1970s, Puri worked in supporting roles, usually as the henchman of the main villain. The super-hit movie Hum Paanch (1980) was the first film in which he played the main villain. His acting performance, personality and voice were all noticed and duly appreciated in this film. After that, he started getting cast as the main villain in other movies. Puri went on to work in Hindi, Kannada, Marathi, Punjabi, Malayalam, Telugu, Tamil and even Hollywood films. His main field was, of course, Hindi cinema.

In 1982, Puri played the main villain, Jagavar Choudhary in the Subhash Ghai super-hit film Vidhaata. That year, he again played the main villain, JK in the movie Shakti co-starring Dilip Kumar and Amitabh Bachchan. Next, in 1983, Ghai again cast him as the main villain, Pasha, in the hit movie Hero. Puri regularly featured in subsequent Ghai films.

He is known to international audiences for his roles as the main antagonist Mola Ram in Steven Spielberg's Indiana Jones and the Temple of Doom (1984) and as Gandhi's Muslim employer and patron in South Africa in Richard Attenborough's Gandhi (1982). For Indiana Jones, he shaved his head and it created such an impression that he kept his head shaved thereafter. His baldness gave him the flexibility to experiment with different looks as a villain in subsequent movies, and few are aware that in every film thereafter, Puri was wearing a wig. Puri and Spielberg shared a great rapport and Spielberg often said in interviews: "Amrish is my favorite villain. The best the world has ever produced and ever will!"

Puri reigned supreme in villainous roles in the 1980s and 1990s. His dominating screen presence and baritone voice made him stand out amongst the other villains of the day. In villainous roles, Puri is best remembered as "Mogambo" in Mr. India, "Jagavar" in Vidhaata, "Thakral" in Meri Jung, "Bhujang" in Tridev, "Balwant Rai" in Ghayal, Barrister Chadda in Damini and "Thakur Durjan Singh" in Karan Arjun. His comic role in Chachi 420, that he acted alongside Kamal Haasan was highly appreciated. 

From the 1990s until his death in 2005, Puri also featured in positive supporting roles in many movies. Some of his notable positive roles are Dilwale Dulhaniya Le Jayenge, Phool Aur Kaante, Gardish, Pardes, Virasat, Ghatak, Mujhe Kucch Kehna Hai, China Gate. He received the Filmfare Best Supporting Actor award for Meri Jung and Virasat.

Death 
Puri was suffering from myelodysplastic syndrome, a rare kind of blood cancer, and had undergone brain surgery for his condition after he was admitted to the Hinduja Hospital on 27 December 2004. His condition required frequent removal of the blood accumulated in the cerebral region of the brain and after some time he slipped into a coma shortly before his death around 7:30 a.m on 12 January 2005.

His body was brought to his residence for people to pay their last respects, and his funeral was on 13 January 2005 at Shivaji Park crematorium.

Legacy 

On 22 June 2019, Puri was honoured with a Google Doodle. Commemorating his 87th birthday, Google carried his picture and the accompanying text read as, "If at first you don't succeed, try, try again—and you might end up like Indian film actor Amrish Puri, who overcame an early setback on the way to fulfilling his big screen dreams."

Awards

Wins 
 1968: Maharashtra State Drama
 1979: Sangeet Natak Akademi Award for Theatre
 1986: Filmfare Award for Best Supporting Actor – Meri Jung
 1991: Maharashtra State Gaurav Pur Ghatak
 1997: Screen Award for Best Supporting Actor – Ghatak: Lethal
 1997: Filmfare Award for Best Supporting Actor – Ghatak: Lethal
 1998: Filmfare Award for Best Supporting Actor – Virasat
 1998: Screen Award for Best Supporting Actor – Virasat

Nominations 
 1990: Filmfare Award for Best Villain – Tridev
 1992: Filmfare Award for Best Villain – Saudagar
1993: Filmfare Award for Best Supporting Actor – Muskurahat
 1993: Filmfare Award for Best Villain – Tahalka
1994: Filmfare Award for Best Supporting Actor – Gardish
 1994: Filmfare Award for Best Villain – Damini
1996: Filmfare Award for Best Supporting Actor – Dilwale Dulhania Le Jayenge
 1996: Filmfare Award for Best Villain – Karan Arjun
 1999: Filmfare Award for Best Villain – Koyla
 2000: Filmfare Award for Best Villain – Baadshah
 2002: Filmfare Award for Best Villain – Gadar: Ek Prem Katha
 2002: Zee Cine Award for Best Actor in a Negative Role – Gadar: Ek Prem Katha

Filmography

Bibliography

See also 

 List of Bollywood actors

References

External links 

 
 Obituary from rediff
 Obituary from Times of India

1932 births
2005 deaths
Punjabi Hindus
20th-century  Indian male actors
21st-century Indian male actors
Filmfare Awards winners
Screen Awards winners
Indian male film actors
Indian male stage actors
Male actors in Hindi cinema
Male actors in Kannada cinema
Male actors in Malayalam cinema
Male actors in Marathi cinema
Male actors in Punjabi cinema
Male actors in Tamil cinema
Male actors in Telugu cinema
People from Shaheed Bhagat Singh Nagar district
Punjabi people
Recipients of the Sangeet Natak Akademi Award